Guardo is a municipality in the province of Palencia, in the autonomous community of Castile-Leon, Spain.

The town is located at 42° 47' 00" north, 4° 50' 00" west on the banks of the Carrión River. It is the second most populated municipality after the capital, Palencia, in the province of Palencia. Its construction is modern, ordered in an urbanized affluent nucleus. The center of the town is on the left bank of the river.  The right bank contains the railway and industrial facilities.

Urban structure and monuments 

The historic district is divided into three neighborhoods – Barruelo, La Fuente and La Plaza – situated on the eastern slope of the Carrión River Valley. The historic district contains a magnificent Baroque palace built in the 18th century by Bishop Francisco Díaz-Santos de Bullón. The palace currently houses the Centre for Teacher Training and Educational Innovation.

There are several impressive large houses on either side of the palace and another, near the church of San Juan, contains the House of Culture and the Municipal Library. The church was built in the 17th century.

A 16th-century bridge crosses the Carrión River. On 13 June a festival is held in honor of San Antonio de Padua. Every Friday there is a weekly market.

References

External links 
Aerial Photograph
More Information about Guardo (In Spanish)
Interactive Map (In Spanish)
Información, historia y fotografías de Guardo 

Municipalities in the Province of Palencia